Ion Demerji (born 28 April 1989) is a football player who since 2013 has played for FC Saxan.

References

moldova.sports.md

1989 births
Living people
Moldovan footballers
FC Zimbru Chișinău players
Association football midfielders